Anderson Hays Cooper (born June 3, 1967) is an American broadcast journalist and political commentator currently anchoring of the CNN news broadcast show Anderson Cooper 360°. In addition to his duties at CNN, Cooper serves as a correspondent for 60 Minutes on CBS News. After graduating from Yale University with a Bachelor of Arts in 1989, he began traveling the world, shooting footage of war-torn regions for Channel One News. Cooper was hired by ABC News as a correspondent in 1995, but he soon took more jobs throughout the network, working for a short time as a co-anchor, reality game show host, and fill-in morning talk show host.

In 2001, Cooper joined CNN, where he was given his own show, Anderson Cooper 360°, in 2003; he has remained the show's host since. He developed a reputation for his on-the-ground reporting of breaking news events, with his coverage of Hurricane Katrina causing his popularity to sharply increase. For his coverage of the 2010 Haiti earthquake, Cooper received a National Order of Honour and Merit, the highest honor granted by the Haitian government. From September 2011 to May 2013, he also served as the host of his own syndicated daytime talk show, Anderson Live.

Cooper has won 18 Emmy Awards and two Peabody Awards, as well as an Edward Murrow Award from the Overseas Press Club in 2011. A member of the Vanderbilt family, he came out as gay in 2012, becoming "the most prominent openly gay journalist on American television". In 2016, Cooper became the first openly LGBT person to moderate a presidential debate, and he has received several GLAAD Media Awards.

Early life and education
Cooper was born in Manhattan, New York City, the younger son of writer Wyatt Emory Cooper and artist Gloria Vanderbilt. His maternal grandparents were millionaire equestrian Reginald Claypoole Vanderbilt of the Vanderbilt family and socialite Gloria Morgan Vanderbilt, and Reginald's patrilineal great-grandfather was business magnate Cornelius Vanderbilt, who founded the prominent Vanderbilt shipping and railroad fortune. He has two older half-brothers, Leopold Stanislaus "Stan" Stokowski (b. 1950) and Christopher Stokowski (b. 1952), from Gloria's ten-year marriage to conductor Leopold Stokowski. In 2014, Cooper appeared in Henry Louis Gates Jr.'s Finding Your Roots, where he learned of an ancestor, Burwell Boykin, who was a slave owner from the southern United States. Gloria Morgan was a granddaughter of American Civil War brevet Major General Hugh Judson Kilpatrick, who was with General William Tecumseh Sherman on his march through Georgia, and of the Major General's Chilean wife, Luisa Fernandez de Valdivieso. Through Reginald, he is a second cousin, once removed, of screenwriter James Vanderbilt. He is also a third cousin, once removed, of actor Timothy Olyphant.

Cooper's media experience began early. As a baby, he was photographed by Diane Arbus for Harper's Bazaar. At the age of three, Cooper was a guest on The Tonight Show on September 17, 1970, appearing with his mother. At the age of nine, he appeared on To Tell the Truth as an impostor. From age 10 to 13, Cooper modeled with Ford Models for Ralph Lauren, Calvin Klein and Macy's.

Wyatt experienced a series of heart attacks while undergoing open-heart surgery, and died January 5, 1978, at the age of 50. Cooper considers his father's book Families to be "sort of a guide on... how he would have wanted me to live my life and the choices he would have wanted me to make. And so I feel very connected to him."

When Cooper was 21, his older brother, Carter Vanderbilt Cooper, committed suicide on July 22, 1988, at age 23, by jumping from the 14th-floor terrace of Vanderbilt's New York City penthouse apartment. Gloria Vanderbilt later wrote about her son's death in the book A Mother's Story, in which she expressed her belief that the suicide was caused by a psychotic episode induced by an allergy to the anti-asthma prescription drug salbutamol. Carter's suicide sparked Anderson's interest in journalism:

Cooper attended the Dalton School, a private co-educational day school on the Upper East Side of Manhattan. At age 17, after graduating from Dalton a semester early, Cooper traveled around Africa for several months on a "survival trip". He contracted malaria on the trip and was hospitalized in Kenya. Describing the experience, Cooper wrote "Africa was a place to forget and be forgotten in." Cooper attended Yale University, where he resided in Trumbull College and was a coxswain on the lightweight rowing team. He was inducted into the Manuscript Society and majored in political science, graduating with a Bachelor of Arts in 1989.

Career

Early career
During college, Cooper spent two summers as an intern at the Central Intelligence Agency while studying political science. He pursued journalism with no formal journalistic education. He is a self-proclaimed "news junkie since [he] was in utero". After his first correspondence work in the early 1990s, he took a break from reporting and lived in Vietnam for a year, during which time he studied the Vietnamese language at Vietnam National University, Hanoi.

Channel One
After Cooper graduated from Yale, he tried to gain entry-level employment with ABC answering telephones, but was unsuccessful. Finding it hard to get his foot in the door of on-air reporting, Cooper decided to enlist the help of a friend in making a fake press pass. At the time, Cooper was working as a fact checker for the small news agency Channel One, which produces a youth-oriented news program that is broadcast to many junior high and high schools in the United States. Cooper then entered Myanmar on his own with his forged press pass and met with students fighting the Burmese government. He was ultimately able to sell his home-made news segments to Channel One.

After reporting from Myanmar, Cooper lived in Vietnam for a year to study the Vietnamese language at the University of Hanoi. Persuading Channel One to allow him to bring a Hi8 camera with him, Cooper soon began filming and assembling reports of Vietnamese life and culture that aired on Channel One. In 1992, he returned to filming stories from a variety of war-torn regions around the globe, including Somalia, Bosnia, and Rwanda.

After having been on such assignments for a couple of years, Cooper realized in 1994 that he had slowly become desensitized to the violence he was witnessing around him; the horrors of the Rwandan genocide became trivial: "I would see a dozen bodies and think, you know, it's a dozen, it's not so bad." One particular incident, however, snapped him out of it:

ABC
In 1995, Cooper became a correspondent for ABC News, eventually rising to the position of co-anchor on its overnight World News Now program on September 21, 1999. In 2000, he switched career paths, taking a job as the host of ABC's reality show The Mole:

Cooper was also a fill-in co-host for Regis Philbin on Live with Regis and Kelly in 2007 when Philbin underwent triple-bypass heart surgery. As of 2019, he still periodically serves as guest co-host on Live when one of the two hosts cannot go in to work.

CNN

Cooper left The Mole after its second season to return to broadcast news. In 2001, he joined CNN, commenting, "Two seasons was enough, and 9/11 happened, and I thought I needed to be getting back to news." His first position at CNN was to anchor alongside Paula Zahn on American Morning. In 2002, he became CNN's weekend prime-time anchor. Since 2002, he has hosted CNN's New Year's Eve special from Times Square.

Anderson Cooper 360°
On September 8, 2003, Cooper became the anchor of Anderson Cooper 360° on CNN. Describing his philosophy as an anchor, he has said:

In 2005, Cooper covered a number of important stories, including the tsunami damage in Sri Lanka; the Cedar Revolution in Beirut, Lebanon; the death of Pope John Paul II; and the royal wedding of Prince Charles and Camilla Parker Bowles. In August 2005, he covered the Niger famine from Maradi.

In 2005, during CNN coverage of the aftermath of Hurricane Katrina, he confronted Sen. Mary Landrieu, Sen. Trent Lott, and the Reverend Jesse Jackson about their perception of the government response. As Cooper said later in an interview with New York magazine, "Yeah, I would prefer not to be emotional and I would prefer not to get upset, but it's hard not to when you're surrounded by brave people who are suffering and in need." A contributor to Broadcasting & Cable magazine wrote: "In its aftermath, Hurricane Katrina served to usher in a new breed of emo-journalism, skyrocketing CNN's Anderson Cooper to superstardom as CNN's golden boy and a darling of the media circles because of his impassioned coverage of the storm."

In September 2005, the format of CNN's NewsNight was changed from 60 to 120 minutes to cover the unusually violent hurricane season. To help distribute some of the increased workload, Cooper was temporarily added as co-anchor to Aaron Brown. This arrangement was reported to have been made permanent the same month by the president of CNN's U.S. operations, Jonathan Klein, who has called Cooper "the anchorperson of the future". Following the addition of Cooper, the ratings for NewsNight increased significantly; Klein remarked that "[Cooper's] name has been on the tip of everyone's tongue." To further capitalize on this, Klein announced a major programming shakeup on November 2, 2005. Cooper's 360° program would be expanded to two hours and shifted into the 10:00pm ET slot formerly held by NewsNight, with the third hour of Wolf Blitzer's The Situation Room filling in Cooper's former 7:00pm ET slot. With "no options" left for him to host shows, Aaron Brown left CNN, ostensibly having "mutually agreed" with Jonathan Klein on the matter.

In early 2007, Cooper signed a multi-year deal with CNN that would allow him to continue as a contributor to 60 Minutes, as well as doubling his salary from $2 million annually to a reported $4 million.

CNN Heroes: An All-Star Tribute
In 2007, he began hosting CNN Heroes: An All-Star Tribute, a show which honors and recognizes extraordinary deeds by ordinary people.

Planet in Peril documentary
In October 2007, Cooper began hosting the documentary Planet in Peril with Sanjay Gupta and Jeff Corwin on CNN. In 2008, Cooper, Gupta, and Lisa Ling from National Geographic Explorer teamed up for a sequel, Planet in Peril: Battle Lines, which premiered in December 2008.

Syndicated talk show: Anderson Live
In September 2010, Warner Bros. and Telepictures (both corporate siblings of CNN) announced that Cooper had signed an agreement to host a nationally syndicated talk show. The journalist Brian Stelter (at the time employed by The New York Times, and now by CNN), reported on Twitter that the new Warner Bros. daytime talk show would be named Anderson (now titled Anderson Live). The show premiered on September 12, 2011, and as part of negotiations over the talk show deal, Cooper signed a new multi-year contract with CNN to continue as the host of Anderson Cooper 360°. On October 29, 2012, it was announced that Anderson Live would end at the conclusion of its second season. The show, slightly renamed after season one and revamped with a variety of co-hosts, failed to achieve the ratings distributor Warner Brothers hoped for. The final Anderson Live aired on May 30, 2013.

2016 presidential debates
Along with Martha Raddatz, Cooper moderated the second presidential election debate between Hillary Clinton and Donald Trump. This made him the first openly LGBT person to moderate a presidential debate in the general election.

New Years Eve
In 2017, Cooper's close friend, Andy Cohen, joined Cooper in succeeding Kathy Griffin as co-host of CNN's New Year's Eve coverage. They again co-hosted CNN's New Year's Eve for 2018, 2019, 2020, 2021, and 2022 .

60 Minutes

Cooper has been a correspondent for the CBS News program 60 Minutes since 2007, while concurrently serving as a CNN anchor and correspondent.

Other work

AC2 
Andy Cohen and Cooper announced that they would be going on a national tour to perform their conversational stage show AC2 beginning in March 2015. The tour opened in Boston, followed by Miami Beach, Chicago and Atlanta. The idea for the show came about after Cooper interviewed Cohen about his then-latest book, The Andy Cohen Diaries, at an event at the 92nd Street Y in New York City. Since then, the two-man show has continued to tour, reaching more than fifty cities as of October 2018.

Broadway 
Cooper was the narrator for the 2011 Broadway revival of How to Succeed in Business Without Really Trying, directed by Rob Ashford and starring Daniel Radcliffe.

Writings 
A freelance writer, Cooper has authored a variety of articles that have appeared in many other outlets, including Details magazine.

In May 2006, Cooper published a memoir for HarperCollins, Dispatches from the Edge, detailing his life and work in Sri Lanka, Africa, Iraq and Louisiana over the previous year. Some of the book's proceeds are donated to charity. The book topped The New York Times Best Seller list on June 18, 2006.

In 2017, Cooper and his mother, Gloria Vanderbilt, co-authored The Rainbow Comes and Goes: A Mother and Son on Life, Love, and Loss. Compiled from a series of emails, the memoir recounts their shared past, and Vanderbilt's tumultuous childhood. Cooper said his goal in writing the book and correspondence was to leave "nothing left unsaid" between the pair. It landed on multiple best-seller lists the year of its publication.

Jeopardy! 
From April 19 to 30, 2021 Cooper served as a guest host on Jeopardy! following the death of Alex Trebek.

Personal life

As of 2016, Cooper was not registered to any political party.

While promoting his book, Cooper told Oprah Winfrey he had dyslexia as a child. In August 2007, he confirmed his "mild dyslexia" on The Tonight Show to Jay Leno, who also has dyslexia.

Cooper is openly gay; as of 2012, he was (according to The New York Times) "the most prominent openly gay journalist on American television". For years, Cooper avoided discussing his private life in interviews. On July 2, 2012, however, he gave Andrew Sullivan permission to publish an email that stated, in part:

In 2014, Apple CEO Tim Cook, before making the decision to publicly come out as gay, sought Cooper's advice.

In 2014, Cooper and his long-term partner at the time, Benjamin Maisani, purchased Rye House, a historic estate in Connecticut. In March 2018, Cooper confirmed that he and  Maisani had split up. The two have remained close friends, however, and went on to co-parent Cooper's children.

Cooper has been friends with Andy Cohen for over twenty years. They often work and support one another closely, including as they navigate raising their children.

Cooper was friends with Anthony Bourdain, celebrity chef and host of the CNN series Parts Unknown. After Bourdain died by suicide on June 8, 2018, Cooper paid tribute to him in a CNN special program, Remembering Anthony Bourdain. Cooper also paid tribute to Bourdain on the Thanksgiving 2020 episode of Anderson Cooper Full Circle, saying that he "was proud to call Anthony Bourdain a friend", and adding: "He is so, so missed by so many."

In 2021, Cooper and co-author Katherine Howe published Vanderbilt: The Rise and Fall of an American Dynasty, a history of the Vanderbilt family going back to his Vanderbilt ancestors who came to New Amsterdam in the 17th century.

Children
On April 30, 2020, Cooper announced the birth of his son Wyatt Morgan Cooper by a surrogate on April 27. "On Monday I became a father. I've never said that out loud and it astonishes me. I have a son," he said at the end of a CNN Town Hall on his show, Anderson Cooper 360°. He also went on to make an announcement on Instagram, stating that "Wyatt Morgan Cooper was born on Monday weighing 7 pounds 2 ounces."

Though Cooper and Benjamin Maisani are no longer romantically involved, the pair co-parent the child and Maisani was present in the delivery room for Wyatt's birth. Wyatt is named after Cooper's late father, Wyatt Cooper, and his middle name is derived from the Vanderbilt side of his family, being the maiden name of his maternal grandmother Gloria Morgan Vanderbilt.

On February 10, 2022, Cooper announced at the beginning of his show on CNN that he had just become a father for a second time to a son named Sebastian Luke Maisani-Cooper. Maisani is in the process of adopting Cooper's son Wyatt, after which Wyatt's surname will become Maisani-Cooper.

Awards

Cooper helped lead CNN's Peabody Award-winning coverage of Hurricane Katrina, and the network's Alfred I. duPont–Columbia University Award-winning coverage of the 2004 tsunami. He has won 18 Emmy Awards, including two for his coverage of the earthquake in Haiti, and an Edward R. Murrow Award.

Other awards 
 Silver Plaque from the Chicago International Film Festival for his report from Sarajevo on the Bosnian War
 Bronze Award from the National Education Film and Video Festival for a report on political Islam

Career timeline 
 1999–2000: World News Now co-anchor
 2001–2002: The Mole host
 2002–present: New Year's Eve Live co-anchor on CNN and CNN International
 2003–present: Anderson Cooper 360° anchor
 2005: NewsNight co-anchor
 2007–present: 60 Minutes correspondent
 2011–2013: Anderson Live
 2021: Jeopardy! guest host

Filmography
 Chappie (2015)
 The 33 (2015)
 Batman v Superman: Dawn of Justice (2016)
 Black Panther: Wakanda Forever (2022)

Books
 Dispatches from the Edge: A Memoir of War, Disasters, and Survival (Harper Perennial, 2006). .
 The Rainbow Comes and Goes (Harper Perennial, 2016). .
 Vanderbilt: The Rise and Fall of an American Dynasty. Hardcover – September 21, 2021

See also
 LGBT culture in New York City
 List of LGBT people from New York City
 New Yorkers in journalism

References

External links

 Anderson Cooper 360° Blog
 CNN: Anchors & Reporters: Anderson Cooper (profile)
 
 
 
 
 
 Anderson Cooper: The Silver Fox
 

 
1967 births
20th-century American journalists
21st-century American businesspeople
21st-century American journalists
21st-century American male writers
60 Minutes correspondents
ABC News personalities
American bloggers
American child models
American expatriates in Vietnam
American game show hosts
American male bloggers
American male film actors
American male journalists
American male models
American memoirists
American television news anchors
American television reporters and correspondents
American television talk show hosts
American war correspondents
CNN people
Dalton School alumni
Gay models
American gay writers
Journalists from New York City
American LGBT broadcasters
American LGBT journalists
Gay memoirists
LGBT people from New York (state)
Living people
Male models from New York (state)
Models from New York City
News & Documentary Emmy Award winners
Participants in American reality television series
Television personalities from New York City
Anderson Cooper
Writers from Manhattan
Yale University alumni
Television presenters with dyslexia
Jeopardy!